Joseph Greenspan (born September 12, 1992) is an American soccer player who plays as a defender for San Diego Loyal in the USL Championship.

Early life and education
Greenspan was born in Summit, New Jersey to Brian and Andrea Greenspan, and was raised in nearby Westfield, where he graduated from Westfield High School in 2011.

Career

College
Greenspan spent his entire college career at the United States Naval Academy.

Professional
Greenspan was selected in the second round (26th overall) of the 2015 MLS SuperDraft by Colorado Rapids. He initially put his soccer career on hold due to military service obligations but came to an agreement with the Navy and Rapids in June 2015, allowing him to fulfill his military requirements and play for the Rapids. Greenspan made his professional debut in a 4–1 win in a Lamar Hunt U.S. Open Cup over the Colorado Springs Switchbacks. He served a year of active duty before the Navy transferred him to the Navy Reserve, allowing him to pursue a soccer career.

Greenspan was traded to MLS expansion club Minnesota United FC following the 2016 season. He was released by Minnesota at the end of their 2017 season.

Greenspan signed for Pittsburgh Riverhounds SC on January 12, 2018.

After two-seasons with Pittsburgh, where he was named USL Championship Defender of the Year in 2019, Greenspan moved to fellow USL side San Diego Loyal SC ahead of their inaugural season.

References

External links

1992 births
Living people
All-American men's college soccer players
American soccer players
Association football defenders
Charlotte Independence players
Colorado Rapids draft picks
Colorado Rapids players
Colorado Springs Switchbacks FC players
Major League Soccer players
Minnesota United FC players
Navy Midshipmen men's soccer players
People from Westfield, New Jersey
Pittsburgh Riverhounds SC players
San Diego Loyal SC players
Soccer players from New Jersey
Sportspeople from Summit, New Jersey
USL Championship players
Westfield High School (New Jersey) alumni
Military personnel from New Jersey